

Incumbents
 President: Julio Argentino Roca
 Vice President: Francisco Bernabé Madero

Governors
 Buenos Aires Province: Dardo Rocha 
 Cordoba: Miguel Juárez Celman then Gregorio Gavier
 Mendoza Province: José Miguel Segura
 Santa Fe Province: Manuel María Zavalla

Vice Governors
Buenos Aires Province: Adolfo Gonzales Chaves

Births
January 21 - Elías Isaac Alippi

 
History of Argentina (1880–1916)
Years of the 19th century in Argentina